There have been 19 head coaches in the history of the San Francisco 49ers professional football franchise. The San Francisco 49ers franchise was formed in 1946 as a charter member of the All-America Football Conference (AAFC) before joining the National Football League (NFL) in 1950 after the AAFC merger with the NFL. Buck Shaw became the first head coach of the 49ers in 1946, serving for nine seasons—four in the AAFC and five in the NFL. He coached a number of future College and Pro Football Hall of Famers, such as Frankie Albert, Joe Perry, Leo Nomellini, Y. A. Tittle, Bob St. Clair and Hugh McElhenny. 

In terms of tenure, Bill Walsh has coached more games (152) and more complete seasons (10) than any other head coach in 49ers franchise history. He led the 49ers to playoff appearances in seven seasons, three of which led to the Super Bowl championship, in 1981, 1984 and 1988. Jerry Rice, Joe Montana, Charles Haley, Ronnie Lott, Johnny Davis, Roger Craig, Fred Dean and Steve Young are among the players Walsh has coached in his career.

Four 49ers coaches—Dick Nolan, Bill Walsh, George Seifert, and Jim Harbaugh—have been named coach of the year by at least one major news organization. Walsh, Jack Christiansen and Mike Singletary are the only 49ers coaches currently in the Pro Football Hall of Fame.
Walsh was selected for his coaching contributions. Singletary and Christiansen were voted into the Hall of Fame primarily for their defensive play. Four times in 49ers history has there been an "interim" head coach. Three games into the 1963 season, coach Red Hickey resigned and was replaced by Jack Christiansen. Christiansen coached the 49ers to a 2–9 record in the remainder of the season and came back to coach the team for four more years. In 1978, Pete McCulley was fired after coaching the 49ers to a 1–8 record. He was replaced by offensive coordinator Fred O'Connor, who was himself fired after leading the 49ers to one win in their final seven games. After a 2–5 start to the 2008 season, Mike Nolan was fired and replaced by Mike Singletary, who finished the season 5–4 and became the official head coach following that season. After a 5–10 start to the 2010 season, Mike Singletary was fired and replaced by Jim Tomsula for the final 49ers game of the 2010 season. Stanford University head coach Jim Harbaugh succeeded Tomsula as head coach in January 2011, and led the franchise to the NFC Championship Game, where the 49ers lost in overtime to the New York Giants. The following season, the 49ers reached Super Bowl XLVII, where they faced off against the Baltimore Ravens, coached by Jim's older brother John Harbaugh. The 49ers trailed by as many as 22 points during the game, but ultimately lost 34–31 to the Ravens; the 49ers losing a Super Bowl for the first time.

Key

Coaches
Note: Statistics are accurate through Super-WildCard Weekend of the 2022 NFL season.

Notes
  Joe Montana, Fred Dean, Steve Young and Ronnie Lott are all Hall of Fame players who were coached by Bill Walsh at some point during their career. Charles Haley, who is now a member of the Pro Football Hall of Fame, was selected to five Pro Bowls in his 14-year career. Roger Craig, coached by Walsh from 1983 to 1988, was a four-time Pro Bowl selection. Another one of Walsh's players, wide receiver Jerry Rice, who played from 1985 to 2004, holds NFL records in receptions, receiving yards, touchdown receptions, all-purpose yards and total touchdowns.
  The winning percentage is calculated using the formula: 
  On September 30, 1963, three games into the season, coach Red Hickey resigned and was replaced by Jack Christiansen. Christiansen coached the 49ers to two wins in the 11 remaining games in the season. He coached the 49ers for another four seasons.
  Midway through the 1978 season, head coach Pete McCulley was fired after leading the 49ers to a 1–8 record. He was replaced by his offensive coordinator Fred O'Connor, who was himself fired after coaching the 49ers to a 1–6 record during the remainder of the season.
  Midway through the 2008 season, Mike Nolan was fired after leading the 49ers to a 2–5 record. He was replaced by his assistant head coach of defense, Mike Singletary.
  Before the final game of the 2010 season, Mike Singletary was fired after leading the 49ers to a 5–10 record. He was replaced by his defensive line coach, Jim Tomsula. Following the season, Tomsula returned to his defensive line coaching position and Jim Harbaugh was hired as the new head coach.

References

 
San Francisco 49ers
Head coaches